Iota Geminorum (ι Geminorum, ι Gem) is a solitary fourth-magnitude star in the constellation Gemini. In the sky, it forms an isosceles triangle with Castor and Pollux, and is located less than a degree from the 5th magnitude stars 64 and 65 Geminorum.

Nomenclature
It has been called by the proper name Propus, meaning "forefoot" in Latin, but this name is now assigned to η Geminorum.

Properties
Based upon an annual parallax shift of 27.10 mass, Iota Geminorum lies some 120.4 light years from the Sun. This is an evolved red clump giant star with a stellar classification of G9 III. It is most likely a member of the galactic thin disk population. The star has 1.89 times the mass of the Sun, but has expanded to 10 times the solar radius. It shines with 48 times the Sun's luminosity from its outer atmosphere at an effective temperature of 4,753 K.

References

G-type giants
Horizontal-branch stars
Gemini (constellation)
Geminorum, Iota
Durchmusterung objects
Geminorum, 60
058207
036046
02821